Paracis is a genus of corals belonging to the family Plexauridae.

The species of this genus are found in Pacific and Indian Ocean, Caribbean.

Species

Species:

Paracis alba 
Paracis alternans 
Paracis bebrycoides

References

Plexauridae
Octocorallia genera